Herald Way Marsh is a 10.6 hectare (26.2 acre) biological site of Special Scientific Interest in  Coventry in the West Midlands. The site was notified in 1988 under the Wildlife and Countryside Act 1981. It is also a Local Nature Reserve.

See also
List of Sites of Special Scientific Interest in the West Midlands

References

Herald Way marsh
Sites of Special Scientific Interest in the West Midlands (county)
Local Nature Reserves in the West Midlands (county)